Shin A-young (born February 18, 1987) is a South Korean television personality and announcer. She was a cast member in the reality show The Genius: Black Garnet. She is also an alumna of Harvard University.

On December 22, 2018, Shin married a non-celebrity two years younger than her. Her husband is also an alumna of Harvard University and works in the financial industry.

Filmography

References

External links 

1987 births
Living people
South Korean announcers
South Korean sports announcers
South Korean television personalities
Harvard University alumni
People from Gwacheon